Cyclosia distanti is a moth in the family Zygaenidae. It was described by Druce in 1891. It is found in Malacca.

References

Moths described in 1891
Chalcosiinae